Taya is a given name and surname, and may refer to:

Surname
 Maaouya Ould Sid'Ahmed Taya, Mauritanean leader
 Omar Katzelma Taya, a candidate in the 1993 Nigerien presidential election

Given name
 Taya Renae Kyle, widow of Chris Kyle
 Taya Parker (born 1978), American model, actress, and singer
 Taya Perry, member of Homemade Jamz Blues Band
 Taya Rikizo, Asakusa Opera singer and influence of Kenichi Enomoto
 Taya Smith Gaukrodger, member of Australian worship band Hillsong UNITED
 Taya Straton (1960–1996), Australian actress
 Taya Valkyrie (born 1983), Canadian professional wrestler
 Taya Zinkin (1918–2003), English journalist and author

Places
 Taya, Algeria
 Taya, Kalewa, Burma

Other
 Taya Station, a railway station in Tokoname, Aichi Prefecture, Japan
 Taya (Luo for "The Light"), a nickname for Kenyan association football club Gor Mahia
 Tell Taya, an archaeological site in Nineveh Province, Iraq

See also
 Daya (disambiguation)
 Taia (disambiguation)
 Thaya, a river in Central Europe
 Tiye (14th century BC), also spelled Taia, Tiy and Tiyi, wife of Egyptian pharaoh Amenhotep III